Seuhn Mecca District is one of four administrative districts of Bomi County, Liberia.

Notes

Districts of Liberia
Bomi County